Pleeth is a surname. Notable people with the surname include:

Anthony Pleeth (born 1948), British cellist
William Pleeth (1916–1999), British cellist